Nicolas Marie Quinette, Baron de Rochemont (September 16, 1762 in Paris – June 14, 1821 in Brussels) was a French politician.

He was a notary in Soissons. He was elected to the Legislative Assembly in 1791, a member of the Convention, and Member of the Council of Five Hundred, and Interior Minister.
 
He was a commissioner in the inquiry of Charles François Dumouriez, was captured by the Austrians, and exchanged for Madame Royale, Marie Thérèse of France, daughter of Louis XVI.

In 1796, he presided from 21 November 1796 to 20 December. During the Hundred Days, on June 2, 1815, he sat in the Imperial House of Peers.

Legislative Terms 
  09/09/1791 – 20/09/1792  : Aisne - Extrème Left	
  04/09/1792 – 26/10/1795 : Aisne - Left
  15/10/1795 – 26/12/1799 : Ain - Bonapartiste

References

1762 births
1821 deaths
Politicians from Paris
French interior ministers
Members of the Legislative Assembly (France)
Deputies to the French National Convention
Regicides of Louis XVI
Members of the Council of Five Hundred
Members of the Chamber of Peers of the Hundred Days